Chenar-e Modvi may refer to:

Chenar-e Modvi-e Bala
Chenar-e Modvi-e Pain